The XVI Corps was a corps-sized formation of the United States Army.

History
The XVI Corps was initially constituted on 1 October 1933 as part of the Organized Reserves, and was activated on 7 December 1943 at Fort Riley, Kansas. During World War II, XVI Corps fought in the European Theater of Operations as part of the Ninth United States Army.  The Corps comprised the 29th Infantry Division under Major General Charles H. Gerhardt, the 75th Infantry Division under Major General Ray E. Porter, the 79th Infantry Division under Major General Ira T. Wyche, and the 95th Infantry Division under Major General Harry L. Twaddle.

After the end of the war the corps was inactivated on 7 December 1945 at Camp Kilmer, New Jersey.

XVI Corps was reactivated in April 1951 as the Far East Command reserve. Following its reactivation in May 1951, XVI Corps was headquartered at Sendai, Japan, until it was deactivated there on 20 November 1954.  The corps mission was to control divisions and other units attached to it by Far East Command. Elements of the 40th and 24th Infantry Divisions and the 1st Cavalry Division under XVI Corps control were stationed at Camp Schimmelpfennig from 1951 until after the corps was inactivated.

The corps was active again from 22 November 1957 until 30 April 1968 at Omaha, Nebraska.  During this time, the Corps oversaw a number of Army Reserve units in the southwestern mid-West and the mountain states.

Major General Kermit L. Davis wrote regarding the XVI Corps during the Vietnam War: '.. "I was then assigned as CG, XVI Corps, in Omaha, in charge of the Reserves of Kansas, Nebraska, Colorado, and Wyoming. This turned out to be mostly fire suppression, because ..Robert McNamara had just announced the Reserves should be merged with the National Guard. I had to try to convince my 27,000 reservists that he didn't really mean it. Nobody believed me, and I spent a frustrating two years smoothing ruffled political feathers. Powerful politicians prevented the merger, ..'

Campaign credits
 Rhineland
 Central Europe

Commanders
 Maj. Gen. John B. Anderson (December 1943 – October 1945)
 Maj. Gen. Thomas D. Finley (October 1945 – December 1945)
 Maj. Gen. Roderick R. Allen (August 1951 – 1952)
 Maj. Gen. Clovis E. Byers (1952–1952)
 Maj. Gen. Blackshear M. Bryan (1952 – August 1953)
 Maj. Gen. Samuel T. Williams (August 1953 – November 1954)

Artillery commander
 Brig. Gen. Charles C. Brown (December 1943 – December 1945)

Notes

References
 Clay, Steven E., (2010). U.S. Army Order of Battle 1919–1941. Volume 1. Fort Leavenworth: Combat Studies Institute Press 
 Stanton, Shelby L., (1991).  World War II Order of Battle. New York: Galahad Books 
 Wilson, John B., compiler (1999).  Armies, Corps, Divisions, and Separate Brigades. Washington, D.C.: Government Printing Office.

Further reading 
 

16
16
Military units and formations established in 1943
Military units and formations disestablished in 1968